The following are the national records in Olympic weightlifting in the Solomon Islands. Records are maintained in each weight class for the snatch lift, clean and jerk lift, and the total for both lifts by the Solomon Islands Weightlifting Federation.

Current records

Men

Women

Historical records

Men (1998–2018)

Women (1998–2018)

References

External links

Weightlifting
Solomon Islands
Solomon Islands
Olympic weightlifting